Pascoea spinicollis is a species of beetle in the family Cerambycidae. It was described by Jean Baptiste Boisduval in 1835.

References

Tmesisternini
Beetles described in 1835